The 2012 Shanghai Shenhua season was Shanghai Shenhua's 9th season in the Chinese Super League and 50th overall in the Chinese top flight. They also competed in the Chinese FA Cup that year, getting knocked out of that competition.

Players

First team squad
As of 28 October 2012

Reserve squad

Transfers

Winter

In:

Out:

Summer

In

Out:

Competitions

Preseason and friendlies

Chinese Super League

Results summary

Results by round

Results

Table

Chinese FA Cup

Squad statistics

Appearances and goals

|-
|colspan="14"|Players who appeared for Shanghai Shenhua no longer at the club:

|}

Top scorers

Disciplinary record

Overall
{|class="wikitable"
|-
|Games played || 31 (29 Chinese Super League, 2 Chinese FA Cup)
|-
|Games won || 7 (7 Chinese Super League)
|-
|Games drawn || 16 (14 Chinese Super League, 2 Chinese FA Cup)
|-
|Games lost || 8 (8 Chinese Super League)
|-
|Goals scored || 35 (35 Chinese Super League)
|-
|Goals conceded || 34 (34 Chinese Super League)
|-
|Goal difference || +1 (+1 Chinese Super League, 0 Chinese FA Cup)
|-
|Clean sheets || 10 (8 Chinese Super League, 2 Chinese FA Cup)
|-
|Yellow cards || 65 (62 Chinese Super League, 3 Chinese FA Cup)
|-
|Red cards || 3 (3 Chinese Super League)
|-
|Worst discipline || Dai Lin (11 , 1 )
|-
|Best result || W 5 – 1 (H) v Hangzhou Greentown – Chinese Super League – 4 August 2012
|-
|Worst result || L 0 – 2 (A) v Changchun Yatai – Chinese Super League – 16 June 2012
|-
|Most appearances || Wang Dalei (30 appearances)
|-
|Top goalscorer || Didier Drogba (9 goals) 
|-

References

Shanghai Shenhua F.C. seasons
Shanghai Shenhua F.C.